Kosmos 615 ( meaning Cosmos 615), also known as DS-P1-I No. 13, was a satellite which was used as a radar target for anti-ballistic missile tests. It was launched by the Soviet Union in 1973 as part of the Dnepropetrovsk Sputnik programme.

Launch 
It was launched aboard a Kosmos-2I 63SM rocket, from Site 133/1 at Plesetsk. The launch occurred at 11:10:03 UTC on 13 December 1973.

Orbit 
It decayed from orbit on 17 December 1975.

Kosmos 615 was the thirteenth of nineteen DS-P1-I satellites to be launched. Of these, all reached orbit successfully except the seventh.

See also 

 1973 in spaceflight

References 

1973 in spaceflight
Kosmos 0615
1973 in the Soviet Union
Spacecraft launched in 1973
Dnepropetrovsk Sputnik program